This is a list of companies based in Oregon. Oregon is the ninth largest by area and the 27th most populous of the 50 United States. The gross domestic product (GDP) of Oregon in 2010 was $168.6 billion; it is the United States's 26th wealthiest state by GDP. The state's per capita personal income in 2010 was $44,447.

Oregon has one of the largest salmon-fishing industries in the world, although ocean fisheries have reduced the river fisheries in recent years. The state is home to many breweries, and Portland has the largest number of breweries of any city in the world. High technology industries and services have been major employers since the 1970s. Tektronix was the largest private employer in Oregon until the late 1980s. Intel's creation and expansion of several facilities in eastern Washington County continued the growth that Tektronix had started. Intel is now the state's largest for-profit private employer, with more than 17,000 employees, while Providence Health & Services, a nonprofit, is the largest private employer.

Companies currently based in Oregon

0-9
 @Large Films
 1859 magazine

A
 A-dec
 Acumed
 Aftermath Media
 Airblaster
 Al Mar Knives
 American Blimp Corporation
 Arcimoto
 Aspen Capital
 Avia
 Axium

B
 Benchmade
 Bent Image Lab
 Better World Club
 Betty Rides
 BioSphere Plastic
 Blackstone Audio
 Bonfire Snowboarding
 Breedlove Guitars
 Burley Design
 Bustos Media

C
 Calico Light Weapons Systems
 Cambia Health Solutions
 Cascade Microtech
 CD Baby
 Clean Edge
 Click Commerce
 Co-Motion Cycles
 CodePen
 CollegeNET
 The Collins Companies
 Columbia River Knife & Tool
 Columbia Sportswear
 Consumer Cellular
 Crafty Games
 Croman Corporation
 Curotek

D
 Daimler Truck North America
 Dakine
 DAT Solutions
 Dark Horse Comics
 DeMarini
 DH Press
 Digimarc
 Digital Trends
 Discogs
 Dutch Bros
 Danner Boots
 Dave's Killer Bread

E
 E&F Miler Industries
 Eagle Newspapers
 Electro Scientific Industries
 Elite Care
 EllisLab
 Emmert International
 Erickson Inc.
 ESCO Group
 Extensis

F
 Falcon Northwest
 FEI Company
 FILMguerrero
 FLIR Systems
 Freightliner Trucks
 The Fruit Company

G
 Gene Tools
 Gerber Legendary Blades
 Gothic Beauty
 Grace Bio-Labs
 Grange Cooperative
 Great Cats World Park
 The Greenbrier Companies
 Grenade Gloves
 Greyday Productions
 Ground Kontrol

H
 Harry & David
 Harvest House
 Hawthorne Books
 Hedgebrook
 Heitman Analytics
 Holiday Rambler
 Home Power 
 House Spirits Distillery
 The Human Bean
 Hydroflask

I
 Image3D
 Imputor?
 InFocus
 IP Fabrics

J
 Janrain
 Jantzen

K
 Keen
 Kershaw Knives
 Kettle Foods
 Kill Rock Stars
 KinderCare Learning Centers

L
 LaCrosse Footwear
 Laika
 Lattice Semiconductor
 Leatherman
 Leupold & Stevens
 Leverage Factory
 Lithia Motors
 Little Big Burger

M
 Made in Oregon
 Mecta
 Mentor Graphics
 MetroPaint
 MotoCzysz

N
 Nemo Design
 Nike, Inc.
 Nosler
 NuScale Power

O
 OlsenDaines
 Omega Morgan
 Oni Press
 Oregon Scientific
 Oregon Venture Fund
 Organically Grown Company
 Out'n'About

P
 Pacific Northwest Wrestling
 PacStar
 Phoseon Technology
 Planar Systems
 Plazm 
 Pop Art, Inc.
 Portland and Western Railroad
 Portland Incubator Experiment
 Pronto Pup
 Puppet

R
 R/West
 Radisys
 Reddaway
 Rentrak
 Rodda Paint
 Rodgers Instruments
 Roseburg Forest Products

S
 Salomon Snowboards
 SawStop
 Schetky Northwest Sales, Inc.
 Second Story Interactive Studios
 Shaver Transportation Company
 Shoe Goo
 Bend Studio
 Smarsh
 SmartCAM
 Soloflex
 Sports Management Worldwide
 Standard Insurance
 Stohr Cars
 Storables
 Sunlight Solar Energy
 Swanson Group Aviation

T
 Tara Labs
 Tec Laboratories
 Tektronix
 TerraCycle
 Teufel Nursery
 Thomas Kemper
 Thrustmaster
 Tillamook County Creamery Association
 Timeless Media Group
 TMT Development
 Toonlet
 TopoQuest
 Trapit
 Trusted Computing Group
 Turtledove Clemens

U
 Umpqua Bank
 Umpqua Research Company
 United Bicycle Institute

V
 Vajra Enterprises
 Vanport Manufacturing
 Vari-Prop
 VeriWave
 Vernier Software & Technology

W
 Webtrends
 Western Communications
 Windward Performance

Z
 ZoomCare

By type

Aircraft and airlines

 Columbia Helicopters
 Epic Aircraft
 Erickson Inc.
 Van's Aircraft

Amusement parks

 Enchanted Forest
 Oaks Amusement Park

Design firms
 Bora Architects
 ZGF Architects LLP

Banks

 Aspen Capital
 Community Bank
 Umpqua Holdings Corporation

Credit unions
 Cascade Community Federal Credit Union
 First Tech Credit Union
 Fi-linx
 Oregon Community Credit Union
 Rogue Credit Union

Breweries

 BridgePort Brewing Company
 Burnside Brewing Company (2010–2019)
 Cascade Lakes Brewing Company
 Deschutes Brewery
 Fort George Brewery
 Full Sail Brewing Company
 Hair of the Dog Brewing Company
 Henry Weinhard's
 McMenamins
 Ninkasi Brewing Company
 Portland Brewing Company
 Rogue Ales
 Widmer Brothers Brewery

Broadcasting
 Alpha Media
 KOBI
 Rose City Radio Corporation

Distilleries

 Clear Creek Distillery
 Hood River Distillers
 House Spirits Distillery
 Rogue Ales

Financial and consulting

 Oregon Venture Fund

Food (manufacturing and related)

 Alpenrose Dairy
 Bittermens
 Bob's Red Mill
 Dave's Killer Bread
 Kenny & Zuke's Delicatessen
 Kettle Foods
 Market of Choice
 Otto's Sausage Kitchen
 Pacific Seafood
 Reser's Fine Foods
 Stash Tea Company
 Stumptown Coffee Roasters
 Tazo
 Tillamook County Creamery Association
 Turtle Island Foods
 United States Bakery
 Willamette Valley Fruit Company

Healthcare
 Cambia Health Solutions
 Legacy Health
 Mercy Flights
 Metro West Ambulance
 Tuality Healthcare

Insurance
 Oregon Mutual Insurance
 StanCorp Financial Group
 Standard Insurance Company
 State Accident Insurance Fund

Lodging
 Shilo Inns

Manufacturing companies

 Benchmade
 Bullseye Glass
 Leatherman
 Oregon Iron Works
 Pendleton Woolen Mills
 Precision Castparts Corp.
 Schnitzer Steel Industries

Publishers

Book publishers

 Beyond Words Publishing
 Binford & Mort
 CALYX
 CNS Productions
 Dark Horse Comics
 DH Press
 Harvest House
 Hawthorne Books
 Microcosm Publishing
 Oni Press
 Oregon Catholic Press
 Oregon State University Press
 Underland Press
 University of Oregon Press
 Wipf and Stock

News publishers
 OregonLive.com
 Pamplin Media Group
 The Register-Guard

Record labels

 Arena Rock Recording Company
 Audio Dregs
 Badman Recording Co.
 Cavity Search Records
 Chainsaw Records
 FILMguerrero
 Gnar Tapes
 Greyday Productions
 Heinz Records
 Hush Records
 Hypnos
 Kill Rock Stars
 Marriage Records
 Projekt Records
 Reverb Records
 Rise Records
 Shelflife Records
 Slender Means Society
 Soleilmoon Recordings
 Solid Rock Records
 States Rights Records
 Tombstone Records

Restaurants

 Boon Brick Store
 Bullwinkle's Restaurant
 Dan and Louis Oyster Bar
 Dutch Bros. Coffee
 Huber's
 Imbrie Farm
 Laurelhurst Market
 McCormick & Schmick's
 McGrath's Fish House
 McMenamins
 Mo's Restaurants
 The Old Spaghetti Factory
 Oregon Electric Station
 The Original Pancake House
 Pastini Pastaria
 Pietro's Pizza
 Pizza Schmizza
 Portland City Grill
 Sam Bond's Garage
 Shari's Cafe & Pies
 Sizzle Pie
 Venetian Theatre
 Voodoo Doughnut

Retail stores

 A-Boy Plumbing & Electrical Supply
 Alberta Cooperative Grocery
 Bi-Mart
 Dari Mart
 Fred Meyer
 Hanna Andersson
 Les Schwab Tire Centers
 Made in Oregon
 Mattress Lot
 Music Millennium
 Nau
 New Seasons Market
 Oil Can Henry's
 Parr Lumber
 People's Food Co-op
 Plaid Pantry
 Powell's Books
 Smart Foodservice Warehouse Stores
 Wilco

Shipbuilders

 Sause Bros., Inc.
 Zidell Companies

Software companies

 Act-On
 AWS Elemental
 Brandlive
 CenterSpace Software
 Concentric Sky
 Dejal
 EllisLab
 Enli Health Intelligence
 Janrain
 Mentor Graphics
 Panic
 Puppet
 RFPIO
 TenAsys
 Tripwire
 Urban Airship

Utilities
 Bonneville Power Administration
 Eugene Water & Electric Board
 NW Natural
 PacifiCorp
 Portland General Electric

Wineries

 Bethel Heights Vineyard
 Bridgeview Vineyard and Winery
 Cooper Mountain Vineyards
 Cristom Vineyards
 The Eyrie Vineyards
 Foris Vineyards Winery
 HillCrest Vineyards
 King Estate Winery
 Maison Joseph Drouhin
 Sokol Blosser Winery
 Trisaetum Winery
 Valley View Winery
 Willamette Valley Vineyards

Companies formerly based in Oregon

0-9
 2 Player Productions

A
 Ace Hotel
 Alliance Truck Parts
 Alta Bicycle Share

B
 Bettery Inc.

C
 ClearEdge Power
 CH2M Hill

D
 Dirtnap Records
 Dagoba Chocolate

E
 Expensify

F
 Farrell's Ice Cream Parlour

K
 Kaiser Permanente
 Kimber Manufacturing

L
 Lancair

M
 Motorcycle Superstore

N
 Norm Thompson Outfitters

O
 Oregon Steel Mills
 Oregon Chai

P
 PeaceHealth

T
 Taco Time
 Tazo Tea

Defunct companies that were based in Oregon

A
 Air Oregon
 Allalom Music
 Alternative Records
 Ambric

C
 Camera World
 Candy Ass Records
 Cascade Yachts
 Chambers Communications
 Clear Cut Press
 Columbia Aircraft
 Columbia River Shipbuilding Company
 Commercial Iron Works
 Consolidated Freightways

E
 Edge Wireless
 Emporium
 Enli Health Intelligence
 Evergreen International Airlines
 Evergreen International Aviation

F
 Frank Hrubetz & Company

G
 Galena Biopharma
 G.I. Joe's
 Graphic Arts Center Publishing

H
 Hollywood Video

I
 In Other Words Feminist Community Center
 Integra Telecom

J
 J. K. Gill Company

K
 Kaiser Shipyards

L
 Lipman's

M
 Malheur Bell
 MathStar
 Meier & Frank
 Merix Corporation
 Mount Emily Lumber Company
 Mutant Pop Records

N
 NBG Radio Network
 Northwest Steel

O
 Oregon Iron Company
 Oregon Shipbuilding Corporation

P
 Pacific International Enterprises
 Pamplin Music
 Pulphouse Publishing

R
 Rodgers Stores

S
 Sawyer's
 SeaPort Airlines
 Sunn
 SwellPath

T
 Talk Radio Network
 Tim/Kerr
 TriQuint Semiconductor

V
 VIP's

W
 Wah Chang Corporation
 WeoGeo
 West Coast Bancorp
 Willamette Iron and Steel Works

See also
 :Category:Defunct companies based in Oregon
 :Category:Organizations based in Oregon

References

Oregon
Companies